The shame penalty of Leipzig was a controversial penalty decision by referee Bernd Stumpf during a match in the 1985–86 season of the DDR-Oberliga between 1. FC Lokomotive Leipzig and BFC Dynamo, which took place on 22 March 1986 at the Bruno-Plache-Stadion in Leipzig. Following the match, the Deutscher Fußball-Verband (DFV), the umbrella organization for football in East Germany, for the first time permanently banned a referee.

Background
The game between 1. FC Lokomotive Leipzig and BFC Dynamo took place on 22 March 1986 at the sold-out Bruno-Plache-Stadion in Leipzig in front of 13,000 spectators. While the defending champions and record title-holders from Berlin led the table before the 18th matchday, the hosts Leipzig, in fourth place, had to win if they wanted to keep up in the race for the championship.

Match

Summary
Leipzig took the lead from Olaf Marschall in the second minute and kept their lead into the break. In the fourth minute of stoppage time, referee Bernd Stumpf awarded a penalty to BFC Dynamo after a duel between Leipzig player Hans Richter and Bernd Schulz of BFC Dynamo, with its legitimacy not completely clear on the television images. Frank Pastor converted the penalty for BFC Dynamo for the match to finish as a 1–1 draw, leaving 1. FC Lokomotive Leipzig six points behind BFC with eight matchdays remaining, and now in fifth place, seemingly out of the title race. The fact that Leipzig finished only 2 points behind BFC at the end of season gave the game retrospective importance.

Details

Consequences
Due to the alleged long-standing decisions that had gone the way of BFC Dynamo, a tense and aggressive mood could be seen before the match. After the controversial penalty decision of referee Stumpf, unprecedented decisions were made at the association level of East German football. The chairman of 1. FC Lokomotive Leipzig Peter Gießner and high-ranking SED officials in Bezirk Leipzig spoke openly of fraud and demanded that such important matches should no longer take place during the trade fair, "since even the foreign guests could notice some of the filth". 

SED General Secretary Erich Honecker and the Secretary for Security, Youth and Sport in the SED Central Committee Egon Krenz were fed up with the "football question" and the "BFC question". And the constant rioting at the guest performances of BFC Dynamo around the country was annoying in the SED Politburo. Stumpf was consequently made an example of. He was initially given a one-year league suspension. But eventually, he was permanently banned as a result of the continuing negative headlines. The sanctions against Stumpf were approved by Honecker and Krenz in the SED Central Committee. The refereeing committee of the DFV was also suspended and replaced by new members. In various reports, the match went down in history as the Schand-Elfmeter von Leipzig, or the "Shame penalty of Leipzig". Stumpf sent a petition to SED General Secretary Honecker and asked him to review the measures taken against him. Krenz told Honecker that the measures against Stumpf had been "met with broad approval among the population" and asked Honecker to give him the task of answering the letter from Stumpf. Krenz was then allowed to answer Stumpf, and Stumpf was rejected. 

Stumpf later testified that the DFV Deputy General Secretary Volker Nickchen had went for a walk with him before the match  for the referee's briefing. Nickchen had talked about the explosiveness of the match and so on. Stumpf claimed that some things Nickchen said during the walk almost sounded as if 1. FC Lokomotive Leipzig was going to win. Nickchen has denied the allegation and claims that he only asked Stumpf to whistle with sensitivity. Through a training video filmed from a different perspective, which was published by Mitteldeutscher Rundfunk (MDR) in 2000, it was shown that the penalty was correctly awarded and that the sanction of referee Stumpf was unjustified.  The training video showed how Hans Richter pushed Bernd Schulz with both hands in the penalty area.

Explanatory notes

References

General references
 Schand-Elfmeter von Leipzig. In: Hanns Leske: Enzyklopädie des DDR-Fußballs. Verlag Die Werkstatt, Göttingen 2007, 
 
 
 

DDR-Oberliga
Ddr-Oberliga 1985-86
Ddr-Oberliga 1985-86
1985–86 in East German football
Association football controversies
Association football matches in East Germany